Devathalara Deevinchandi is a Telugu-language film directed by Kommineni Seshagiri Rao. His debut film was hit and resulted in many successful films later.

It is remake of Nagin, a highly successful 1976 Hindi film, which in turn was inspired by François Truffaut's film The Bride Wore Black, based on Cornell Woolrich's novel of the same name.

The plot
The story revolves around five close friends: Mohan (Ranganath), Kubera Rao (Haribabu), Muralikrishna (Chandramohan), Giri (Eswara Rao) and Ravindra (Madala Rangarao). Kubera Rao knows about a hidden treasure in the Nallamala Forest. The friends go to the forest to find the treasure in a Naga Temple. They hurt a Nagadevatha during a ritual. Kubera Rao soon dies of a snake bite. Nagadevatha, who takes a human form as Phani (Jayamalini), takes revenge on the five friends.

Cast

Soundtrack
 "Amma Oka Bomma Naanna Oka Bomma - Meekenduku Ee Roju Kopamocchindi" (Singer: Baby Geetha; Cast: Baby Varalakshmi)
 "Konaloki Vastaavaa Kotta Chotu Choopistaanu" (Singer: P. Susheela; Cast: Jayamalini)
 "Nagulachavitiki Nagendraswaami Puttanindaa Paalu Posemu Tandri" (Singer: P. Susheela; Cast: Prabha)
 "O Cheli Manohari Nee Kosame Nenunnadi" (Singers: S. P. Balasubrahmanyam, P. Susheela; Cast: Chandramohan, Jayamalini)
 "Srisaila Malleeswaraa - O Kaalahastiswaraa" (Devatalara, Deevinchandi) (Singer: P. Susheela; Cast: Prabha)

References

External links
 

1977 films
Hindu devotional films
Films about shapeshifting
Indian horror films
Films scored by K. Chakravarthy
Telugu remakes of Hindi films
1970s Telugu-language films
1977 horror films
Films directed by Kommineni Seshagiri Rao